RSAA  may refer to:
Refugee Status Appeals Authority, an appeal body of New Zealand 
Royal Society for Asian Affairs, a learned society based in the United Kingdom